Kobo may refer to:

Places
 Kobo (woreda), a district in Ethiopia
 Kobo, Ethiopia, a town
 Kōbo Dam, Hiroshima Prefecture, Japan
 Mount Kōbō, Kanagawa Prefecture, Japan

People

First name
 Kōbō Abe (1924–1993), pseudonym of Japanese writer, playwright, photographer and inventor Kimifusa Abe
 Kōbō-Daishi, a posthumous name of Kūkai (774–835), Japanese monk, civil servant, scholar, poet, and artist
 Kōbō Kenichi (1973–2021), Japanese sumo wrestler

Surname
 Bebo Kobo, Israeli businessman
 O. D. Kobo (born 1975), Israeli businessman
 Ronny Kobo (born 1980), American fashion designer

Fictional characters
 Kobo Tabata, title character of the manga Kobo, the Li'l Rascal (Kobo-chan)

Other uses
 Kobo language, a language of the Democratic Republic of Congo
 KOBO, a radio station in California, US
 Kobo Inc., a Canadian company, a subsidiary of Japanese e-commerce conglomerate Rakuten, that sells e-books and markets Kobo eReader hardware and software
 Kobo eReader, an e-reader
 KOBO (whale), a blue whale skeleton
 Kobo, the subunit of the Nigerian naira currency

See also
 Co-Bo, a wheel arrangement in the UIC classification system for railway locomotives